The Davidson-Cadillac armored car of 1915 was developed on a Cadillac chassis by Royal Page Davidson and the cadets of the Northwestern Military and Naval Academy in Highland Park, Illinois. This military vehicle is the first true fully armored vehicle made in the United States<ref>Chilton, p. 416 This car has the distinction of being the first true armored car built in the United States.</ref> because it was built specifically just for that purpose and was not a conversion of an automobile or truck.

 Description 

The Davidson car was armor clad around the entire vehicle. It had radiator doors that would open for access and the rear part had an open top, where a machine gun was mounted just behind the driver.

 History 
Royal P. Davidson in 1915 commanded a special fleet of eight military vehicles on a convoy from Chicago to San Francisco to evaluate their performance. The vehicles he designed for military use were built by Cadillac. The column included a reconnaissance scout vehicle with instruments for observation, two wireless radio communications vehicles, field cooking vehicle complete with fireless cookers, a hospital vehicle with operating tables and an X-ray machine, a balloon destroyer, a quartermaster's car and the first fully armored military vehicle. War Department personnel representing the government went with the convoy to give reports on the performance of the vehicles. Some of the vehicles had rapid fire machine-guns and searchlights. Five were eight-cylinder vehicles. The Davidson-Cadillac fully armored military vehicle was capable of  when the roads allowed. It was America's first military fully armored vehicle.

The reconnaissance scout vehicle was equipped with military rifles, map tables, instruments for making maps on the spot, a dictating machine, instruments for observation for seeing behind walls, altitude indicators, and range and elevation finders. The radio wireless communication vehicles came with telescope masts mounted on the running board. They came with generators to generate the normal current of 110 volts. One of these radio vehicles came with a rapid fire Colt automatic machine gun. It also had a powerful electric searchlight with a heliograph shutter. The vehicles with the field kitchen and hospital were mounted on an eight-cylinder chassis of a  wheelbase. Cooking was done using an electric cooker that did not produce any visible fire. The armored vehicle came with bullet-proof steel. It had loopholes for firing out with rifles. It also had a rapid fire Colt automatic machine gun. It came with winch equipment so it could be pulled out of mud. The  balloon destroyer vehicle came with a machine gun making it the first American anti-aircraft vehicle.

Davidson had these military vehicles built to convince the government that a mechanized army was the way to go. Davidson and some of his school cadets drove the fully armored vehicle along with seven other support vehicles for 34 days from the Northwestern Military and Naval Academy in the Chicago area to the Panama Pacific Exposition being held in San Francisco in 1915. The first military convoy across the country received much publicity from many newspapers nationwide. The military vehicles were shipped back by train to the Academy in Highland Park when the exposition was over instead of being driven back, since Davidson achieved his goal of demonstrating to the United States Army and the government that a mechanized army was the technology of the future. Davidson's Automobile Corps convoy of the 8 specially designed military vehicles were driven by the cadets of the Northwestern Military Academy as an escort for the Liberty Bell to the Panama Pacific Exposition on the Lincoln Highway in 1915. This was the last time the Liberty Bell traveled from its home for any exposition.

 Footnotes 

 Sources 

 American men of mark (1917), A Thousand American Men of Mark Today Chilton company (1975), Automotive Industries, Item notes: v.77 1937 Jul-Dec
 Clemens, Al J., The American Military Armored Car,  A.J. Clemens, 1969
 Delta Upsilon fraternity (1902), The Delta Upsilon Decennial Catalogue [1903] Hunnicutt, R.P., Armored Car: A History of American Wheeled Combat Vehicle, Presidio Press (2002), 
 Kane, Joseph Nathan, Famous First Facts - A Record of First Happenings, Discoveries and Inventions in the United States, The H. W. Wilson Company (1950)
 Marquis-Who's Who (1950), Who was who in America. 1943-1950, New Providence, New Jersey
 Marquis-Who's Who (1967), Who was who in America: A Companion Biographical Reference Work to Who's who in America Quaife, Milo Milton, Wisconsin: Its History and Its People 1634-1924, Volume 4, S.J. Clarke Publishing Company (1924)
 Randall, Frank Alfred, Randall and Allied Families, Raveret-Weber printing company (1943)
 Stern, Philip Van Doren, A Pictorial History of the Automobile, Viking Press (1953)
 Tucker, Spencer, Tanks: An Illustrated History of Their Impact, 
 Willcox, Cornélis De Witt, The International Military Digest Annual: A Review of the Current Literature of Military Science for 1915-1918'', Cumulative Digest Corporation (1916)

Further reading

External links
 Cadillac Glossary
 Images from Davidson’s trip to the Panama Pacific International Exposition
 History of the Northwestern Military and Naval Academy

Armoured cars of the United States
World War I armoured cars
Military vehicles introduced in the 1910s